Joey Klein is a Canadian actor and film director. He is most noted for his performance in the 2016 film We're Still Together, for which he won the ACTRA Award for Best Actor from the ACTRA Awards chapter in Toronto and received a Prix Iris nomination for Best Actor at the 20th Quebec Cinema Awards.

His other acting roles have included the films The Girl in the White Coat, New York Minute, The Animal Project, What Keeps You Alive and Through Black Spruce, and the television series 12 Monkeys and This Life.

As a film director, his feature debut The Other Half was released in 2016. His second feature film, Castle in the Ground, premiered at the 2019 Toronto International Film Festival.

Filmography

Film

Television

References

External links

21st-century Canadian male actors
21st-century Canadian screenwriters
Canadian male film actors
Canadian male television actors
Canadian male screenwriters
Film directors from Montreal
Male actors from Montreal
Writers from Montreal
Concordia University alumni
Living people
Year of birth missing (living people)